Drogheda United Football Club is a semi-professional Irish association football club based in Drogheda, County Louth playing in the League of Ireland Premier Division. They play their home matches at Weavers Park.

The current club is the amalgamation of two former clubs in the town: Drogheda United, a non-league club founded in 1919; and Drogheda F.C., founded in 1962. The clubs merged their operations to form the current club in 1975 and have achieved success since 2005 by winning two Setanta Sports Cups, an FAI Cup, a League Cup, and their first league title, the 2007 League of Ireland Premier Division.

Since 2021, the club has competed in the League of Ireland Premier Division, having been automatically promoted as winners of the 2020 League of Ireland First Division.

History

1919–1975: Early years 
Founded in 1919 the original Drogheda United were a non-league club for all of their early years of existence but on Saturday 22 June 1963 another Drogheda Club – Drogheda F.C. (founded in 1962) were elected to the League of Ireland when the league was expanded to include twelve teams rather than ten. In their first season there they finished tenth and also in each of the next three seasons finished in the bottom three. In the 1967–68 season they achieved a respectable fifth-place finish and the following season finished in sixth place. When the league expanded to include fourteen teams the club dropped down the table again finishing in the bottom five in each of the next six seasons and also recording their heaviest league defeat 8–1 to Cork Hibernians in the 1970–71 season. They did, however, get to FAI Cup final that season where they were beaten 3–0 by Limerick in a replay after the first match ended 00..

1975–2003 
In 1975 Drogheda F.C. amalgamated with Drogheda United to form Drogheda United F.C. and the 1975–76 season saw an improvement in fortunes on the field as they finished sixth in the league and they also reached the FAI Cup Final for the second time, this time losing 1–0 to Bohemians. For the next three seasons, quite the opposite at what had happened before, they finished in third place. During these seasons Drogheda United also achieved two club records – their biggest league victory (7–1 v Finn Harps) and Cathal Muckian scoring 21 league goals in a season. The club then endured another tough spell in the league finishing in the bottom half for the next five seasons bar the 1982–83 season when they managed to achieve their second highest ever league placing of second-place (they later won the league in 2007) finishing sixteen points behind Athlone Town. They did win their first ever trophy during these seasons also, the League of Ireland Cup in the 1983–84 season.

The 1984–85 season saw the introduction of the League of Ireland First Division to begin the following season with Drogheda United among the four clubs who were relegated from the Premier Division but in this season also Drogheda United entered European Competition for the first time where they were destroyed against Tottenham Hotspur in the UEFA Cup First Round 14–0 on aggregate. They remained in the First Division until the 1988–89 season when they went up as First Division Champions. Their joy was short-lived, however, as the following season they were relegated although this time they achieved promotion at the first time of asking. In the next two seasons Drogheda battled bravely against relegation surviving by one point and on goal difference in the respective seasons. However, they were relegated for the third time in the 1993–94 season.

Drogheda United were very much becoming a yo-yo club, swapping divisions every season between the 1993–94 and 2000–01 seasons when in 2000–01 they finished a disappointing ninth in the ten-team First Division. In 2002–03 they were promoted to the Premier Division under Harry McCue and were there until the 2016 season, as they got relegated in 2015, coming in twelfth place.

2003–2008: Paul Doolin 
In 2003, McCue was sacked as manager of Drogheda United. Paul Doolin took over and upped the standard of training and fitness levels. However, he found that to compete with the big clubs like Bohemians and Shelbourne he would need a professional squad. In 2004, he made the squad fully professional and gave part-time players the option to turn professional or leave the club. The change to full-time saw the club's fortunes drastically improve. They won their first FAI Cup in 2005, beating Cork City in the final and won back-to-back Setanta Cups in 2006 and 2007.

They also qualified for the UEFA Cup for the 2006–07 season thanks to their 2005 FAI Cup success. This time they fared better than in their first foray into Europe as they defeated HJK Helsinki 4–2 on aggregate in the first qualifying round and were just eliminated 11–10 in an epic penalty shoot-out in the next round against IK Start of Norway. They were also in the UEFA Cup Qualifying stages for the 2007–08 campaign, losing to Helsingborgs IF in the second round.

United finally won the League of Ireland for the first time in 2007, beating Cork City 2–1 at United Park with three games to go. Guy Bates scored the winning goal for Drogheda that day, shooting himself into Drogs folklore. Drogheda were dominant in the league, only losing three games and winning the title by seven points.

The league win meant that Drogheda would be playing in the Champions League Qualifiers for the first time in their history in the 2008–09 season. They succeeded in their first qualifier against Levadia Tallinn, beating them 3–1 on aggregate. They played the second qualifying round against Dynamo Kyiv which, they ended up losing 4–3 on aggregate. In the first a late goal for Kyiv secured a 2–1 victory at Dalymount Park. In the second game, an early Kyiv goal after 13 minutes seemed to have finished the tie, but remarkably, on 41 minutes, Drogheda were awarded a penalty. Shane Robinson stepped up and slotted home the spot-kick. Drogheda then worked tirelessly trying to get the second goal, but they gave away a penalty on 72 minutes, which was converted. 2–1 down, it seemed the tie was over now. Amazingly however, Graham Gartland scored an 88th-minute goal to make it 2–2. Adam Hughes got a further chance when he had an open goal, but miskicked the ball and it flew over the bar. Then, Shane Robinson hit a shot from a tight angle which hit the post. Despite Drogheda's late rally, they were knocked out by Dynamo Kyiv.

2008 (Examinership) 
 In October 2008 Drogheda went into examinership, like Cork City, after failing to pay back a €500,000 loan to the Revenue Commissioners and  €10,000 rent to Bohemians for their use of Dalymount Park in their Champions League Qualifiers. Their plans for a new €35m stadium fell through and in November 2008 they were deducted 10 points. After successfully raising money through various fund raisers arranged by the supporters, the club escaped extinction on 30 January 2009 when a judge ruled in Drogheda's favour, to the delight of the teary eyed chairman Vincent Hoey.

2009–2010

2009 season
In the 2009 season Drogheda got off to a difficult start. Due to bankruptcy, the club went part-time and lost their entire league-winning squad, and manager, Paul Doolin, who took over Cork City. Former Cork and Longford boss Alan Mathews took over. Mathews had to sign a side of semi-pros and free agents. Drogheda were in the bottom half of the table for the whole season, despite some shock wins. On 10 November 2009 they beat Bray Wanderers 2–0 in a relegation play-off.

2010 season
The 2010 season was disastrous on and off the pitch. Drogheda started terribly and after a 6–0 loss at the hands of Sligo Rovers on 15 May, Alan Mathews quit his managerial post. The club appointed youth team coach and Drogheda native Darius Kierans as manager even though he had yet to complete his Europa A licence which is an FAI requirement for league managers. After much objection from the FAI, Kierans became Director of Football and the club appointed Paul Lumsden as Interim Manager. Lumsden took the team for only one game before resigning. Brian Donnelly was then appointed as the second Interim Manager of the season but he too resigned in September. On 27 September, the club announced the imminent arrival as manager of another former player – Bobby Browne. Despite finishing rock-bottom of the table with only four wins and nine draws (a total of 21 points) in 2010 and being relegated, Drogheda United were reprieved after the extinction of Sporting Fingal in February 2011.

2011–2013: Mick Cooke

2011 season
Mick Cooke, manager of Monaghan took over as manager on 27 February 2011, becoming the sixth Drogheda manager in nine months. Cooke appointed former Drogs goalkeeper, Robbie Horgan as his assistant, and inherited the players who had been signed by Bobby Browne to play in the First Division so hopes weren't high. After an awful start, Drogheda beat local rivals Dundalk 2–1 in Oriel Park. The win turned their season around and despite operating on the lowest playing budget in the league, Drogheda managed to avoid relegation. Shortly after, Cooke put pen to paper on a new three-year deal with the club.

2012 season
In 2012, Cooke and Horgan set about building on the foundations of the previous season. Cooke finally had his own team of players and despite having less than a tenth of the budget that the club had in the glory days under Paul Doolin, Drogheda have had their best season by far since then. Between 1 June and 4 August, Drogheda went on an eight-game winning run in the league and cup – the longest winning run in the club's history. On 23 September 2012, Drogheda won the final of the EA Sports Cup beating Shamrock Rovers 3–1 – their first trophy since 2007. The icing on the cake came on 19 October when Drogheda beat the newly crowned 2012 League Champions Sligo Rovers 2–1 at United Park through a first half Alan McNally header and 88th minute Brian Gannon chip to qualify for the Europa League.

2013 season
In 2013, Drogheda reached three finals and despite failing to add to their silverware, reflected the club's rise under Cooke. They were beaten 7–1 in the Setanta Cup final by Shamrock Rovers and 2–0 in the League Cup final by the same opponent. They also reached their first FAI Cup final since winning the competition in 2005, narrowly losing out on a 3-2 thriller against Sligo Rovers. In the Europa League qualifying rounds that season, the club were drawn against Swedish giants Malmö and only lost by a single goal over two legs after a battling performance. Despite this success, Mick Cooke left the club by mutual consent at the end of the season.

2015–2020: First Division

2016 and 2017 seasons
In November 2015 Drogheda appointed former UCD manager Pete Mahon as manager of the club. John Gill took over as assistant manager with Mark Kinsella ex Irish international remaining part of the coaching staff.

In 2015, Drogheda were relegated after finishing bottom of the league. The following season they finished second in the First Division, achieving promotion through the play-offs, before being relegated again after another 12th-place finish in 2017. In 2018, Tim Clancy was appointed as manager after the departure of Mahon.

2018 season
Clancy's first season in charge of the Drogs saw them finish in 4th place, after a rebuild of the squad who were relegated in 2017. It was enough for a place in the playoffs, but despite beating Shelbourne on penalties after 2 legs, Drogheda failed to beat Finn Harps on aggregate, meaning they would remain in the second tier. Harps would go on to win promotion after defeating Limerick 3–0 on aggregate.

2019 season
2019 was a bittersweet year for Drogheda. They managed to maintain a close title race with Shelbourne up until the penultimate game of the season, when the Reds beat them 3–1 on home soil to secure the title. A second-place finish granted them a playoff spot yet again, and after a 6-2 aggregate win over Cabinteely, they reached the playoff final, meeting Finn Harps for the second year running. Unfortunately for the Drogs, a late winner from Chris Lyons at United Park was not enough, as they shipped 2 goals in the second leg in Ballybofey, condemning them to playoff heartbreak once again. On 30 October, the club and wider Drogheda community was rocked by the passing of a legendary figure, Vincent Hoey, fondly remembered as "Mr. Drogheda United", former chairman and the man responsible for keeping the club afloat through their years of administration

2020 season
Drogheda were pipped as favourites to go all the way in the 2020 season, as Tim Clancy strengthened his team with the additions of former captain Derek Prendergast, as well as Brandon Bermingham, Hugh Douglas and David Odumosu. United opened their season with a 2–0 away win at Cobh Ramblers on 22 February, followed by a 1–0 home loss to Longford Town F.C. 6 days later. They hammered relegated side UCD 5–1 at home on 6 March, and sat top of the table with 6 points when the league was suspended as a result of the COVID 19 pandemic on 12 March. A break of over 3 months would follow, and they finally returned to action with a 2–2 draw to Shamrock Rovers II on 2 August, without spectators. The Drogs only lost 3 games between the months of August and November, and their title race with Bray Wanderers went down to the final day, when they travelled to the Stradbrook to face Cabinteely on 27 October. At the beginning of the evening, Drogheda were 1 point behind their Wicklow counterparts, but a 2–0 win courtesy of goals from James Brown and Luke Heeney meant they would lift the trophy on a historic night which granted them a place in the 2021 League of Ireland Premier Division.

2021-present: Back in the Premier Division

2021 season
There was little expectation on the newly promoted Drogs team as the 2021 season approached, but this changed when Tim Clancy began his recruitment. The young coach managed to attract the experienced heads of Gary Deegan, Dane Massey, Dinny Corcoran and Ronan Murray, all veterans of the league. Darragh Markey and Daniel O'Reilly also added to an already very youthful and talented group of players. The season was opened on 19 March when Drogheda beat Waterford 1–0 at home. A 4–0 away win against rivals Longford Town on 10 April turned heads the way of the County Louth side, but they had to wait a bit longer for their next 3 points of the campaign, a 7-0 thumping of Waterford's reserve side at the RSC on 8 May. This was followed by a 4-game winning run, including a 3–1 win over Saint Patrick's Athletic on 14 May, a 1–0 away victory at Finn Harps, and a 4–1 home win against Longford. Another impressive performance came when Drogheda won 2–1 against Sligo Rovers at the Showgrounds on 12 June, Chris Lyons scoring a brace. Their surprise victories meant the newly promoted side were pushing for European places deep into the season, when many expected them to be in a relegation dogfight. On 20 August, Drogheda pulled off a historic victory over their rivals Dundalk at Oriel Park, the first time they had done so for 9 years, courtesy of a Mark Doyle brace. Just over 2 weeks later, they defeated Bohemians at Head In The Game Park. Their last win of the season came against high fliers Derry City on 24 October. Unfortunately for the Drogs, they finished the season with 3 losses in a row, but it didn't manage to take away from their impressive season, finishing 7th with a respectable 44 points, and making sure of a Premier Division place for 2022

2022 season
Drogheda's impressive 2021 campaign meant their squad was practically torn apart by the bigger clubs in the pre season of 2022. Their manager, Tim Clancy, was signed by St Patrick's Athletic. Shelbourne legend Kevin Doherty, who had been assistant manager to Clancy since 2018, assumed the role of first team manager, and former Longford Town coach Daire Doyle joined his management team. Key players such as Killian Phillips and James Brown secured lucrative moves to the UK. Doherty had a big job on his hands to paper the cracks left in his team, but did well to hang on to a number of key players, as well as recruiting others. Drogheda grabbed their first win of the season on 4 March, beating UCD 4–2 at home. On 18 March, Drogheda beat their Louth rivals Dundalk for the 3rd time in 4 games. On 20 May, 10 man Drogheda came back from a 1–0 deficit to beat Finn Harps at home, with 3 goals in the final 20 minutes. They followed this up with a historic home victory over league champions Shamrock Rovers 3 days later, and a 1–1 draw at Dalymount Park against Bohemians on 27 May. On 9 July, Dean Williams scored one of the fastest goals in League of Ireland history, when his 1st-minute strike gave Drogheda their second derby win of the season at home to Dundalk. They secured safety with a 1-0 victory over Bohemians on 7 October, and finished the season in 8th place with 38 points.

The Claret & Blue Club 
In response to the economic difficulties facing the country, a group of supporters established The Claret & Blue Club in June 2009 with the aim of providing a steady income stream to Drogheda United FC. Supporters who join the Claret & Blue Club donate at least €5 per week to the club, and in return, they receive a membership card entitling them to discounts of up to 10% in a range of local businesses, including restaurants, tile shops, shoe shops and many more. Each member is also entered in a monthly prize draw, with a top prize every month of a sun holiday courtesy of Panorama Holidays. Other prizes include hotel vouchers, tickets to Irish World Cup qualifier games, betting vouchers etc. Publicity on the Derek Mooney Show on RTÉ Radio one and full-page ads in the Drogheda Independent and Drogheda People resulted in a surge of membership, and after only four weeks of existence, the Claret & Blue Club was in a position to bring in over €35,000 to the club annually, with membership figures rising daily. It was hoped that the Claret & Blue Club will take full ownership of the club in 2010 and run the club similar to the way Shamrock Rovers is run by the Shamrock Rovers Members Club. However the target of 500 members was not reached and membership levels settled at just over half that target.

Share Issue 
In January 2011, a Claret and Blue Club steering committee announced new plans for a share issue. It was hoped that 200 shares would be sold at €1000 each and that this new revenue would provide stability for 2011–12 and allow the club to finally become a supporter-owned community club. In early 2012 Drogheda United became a member's owned and run club when a new company Drogheda Utd FC Limited was formed consisting of members who paid €1,000 each into the company.

Emblem 
 The crest of Drogheda United is an adaptation of the town arms of Drogheda, which feature the heraldic symbols of a star and crescent over a shield depicting St. Lawrence's Gate, three lions and a ship. The three lions passant – as Drogheda lay within the Pale and was a besieged garrison town – and the ship represents the town's port.

The club crest focuses on the star and crescent element of the town arms of Drogheda, and are in honor of the Ottoman assistance to Ireland during the Great Famine as the Ottoman Turks docked their ships in Drogheda harbor.

They share the same club colours as Trabzonspor, in Turkey – and in 2011 the two sides became sister clubs.

Supporters and rivalries
Drogs is a nickname for supporters of the club. When the name Drogs started to appear in two newspapers in the late 1990s, The Sun and the Drogheda Leader, the club wrote to the Drogheda Leader Newspaper demanding that the name not be used adding that it was not used in the stadium by the fans. The newspaper argued that it had not invented the name and that the fans in the shed side of the stadium often sing a song called Super Drogs. The club considered the name was degrading and was purely a Drogheda Leader nickname not used by the supporters. In recent years the club officially embraced the nickname.

The most vocal supporters stand on "the shed side" of United Park. Many Drogs attend every home match while a smaller group travel around the country to support the team at away matches. They sing football/Drogheda United chants, wear club colours (claret and blue), wave banners and flags and generally try to help lift the team and demonstrate fervent support. One section of their supporters are known as 'F45U' (Famous 45 Ultras.)

Drogheda United Supporters Club (DUSC) was formed more than two years ago. Its main aim is to promote Drogheda United F.C. throughout the community. The supporters club works hand-in-hand with the football club in various ways including contributing to the match day programme, organising fund raising nights like quizzes and race nights and by organising buses to away matches.

Drogheda United's main rivalry is with their neighbour club Dundalk FC, with whom they contest the Louth Derby. The club's home grounds lie no more than 35 km apart, and fans regularly travel in their numbers to witness the encounter. Fans of the respective clubs despise each other and it makes for one of the biggest rivalries in the country. Since 2010, Dundalk have had the better share of results, but since Drogheda's promotion from the First Division in 2020, it has been quite an even encounter, with 5 wins for Dundalk and 4 wins for Drogheda.

Drogheda have also developed a smaller rivalry with their second nearest club, Shelbourne, due to both teams regularly competing in close proximity to each other on the league table.

Honours

League of Ireland Premier Division
 Champions: 2007
 Runners-up: 1982–83, 2012
League of Ireland First Division
 Champions (5): 1988–89, 1990–91, 1998–99, 2001–02, 2020
 Runners-up: 1994–95, 1996–97, 2016, 2019
FAI Cup
Champions: 2005
 Runners-up: 1970–71, 1975–76, 2013
League of Ireland Cup
Champions (2): 1983–84, 2012
 Runners-up: 2013
Setanta Sports Cup
Champions (2): 2006, 2007
 Runners-up: 2013
League of Ireland First Division Shield
Champions: 1990–91
 Runners-up: 1994–95
Leinster Senior Cup
 Runners-up: 1992–83, 1985–86
LFA President's Cup
 Runners-up: 1970–71
League of Ireland Shield
 Runners-up: 1971–72
Tyler Cup
 Runners-up: 1979

European record

Overview

Matches

Statistics
Graham Gartland has the most appearances for the club in European competitions having appeared a record 12 times in Drogheda's colours in UEFA competitions. He also is tied with Eamon Zayed, on 3 goals, as Drogheda United's leading goalscorer(s) in UEFA competitions.

Finnish international Markus Halsti has played against Drogheda in four matches, lining out with both HJK and Malmö.

Former Drogheda player Gary Rogers holds the record for most appearances in European competition for an Irish domestic player, lining out 54 times during his stints with Saint Patrick's Athletic, Sligo Rovers, and neighbouring club Dundalk.

UEFA 10–year club coefficient ranking

Records

Most League goals

(Players in bold still playing for Drogheda)

Other records

Players

First-team squad

Youth players
The following is a list of youth players who have been in and out of the first team for recent games.

Notable former players 
Republic of Ireland internationals

League of Ireland XI representatives

Republic of Ireland B internationals

Republic of Ireland U23 internationals

Republic of Ireland U21 internationals

Republic of Ireland futsal internationals

Other internationals

Notable academy graduates

Personnel

Technical staff

Management

Managerial history

Supporters Player of the Year Award

References

External links

 
Association football clubs in County Louth
Association football clubs established in 1919
Former League of Ireland Premier Division clubs
Sport in Drogheda
1919 establishments in Ireland
League of Ireland First Division clubs